The Pleito Hills are a low mountain range of the Transverse Ranges System, located in southwestern Kern County, California.

The range is between the San Emigdio Mountains and the San Joaquin Valley, west of the Interstate 5—Highway 99 junction and of the Tehachapi Mountains.

References 

Mountain ranges of Kern County, California
Transverse Ranges
Hills of California
Mountain ranges of Southern California